Stotler is a surname. Notable people with the surname include:

Alicemarie Huber Stotler (1942–2014), American judge
Joseph H. Stotler (1888–1957), American horse trainer

See also
Stohler

German-language surnames